Dietrich Schaeffer (Berlin, 5 December 1933 – 9 May 2010) was a German SPD politician and political rector.

References

1933 births
2010 deaths
Social Democratic Party of Germany politicians